William Philo (17 February 1882 in Islington, Middlesex, England, United Kingdom – 7 July 1916 in France) was a British Middleweight professional boxer who competed in the early twentieth century. He won a bronze medal in Boxing at the 1908 Summer Olympics losing against Reginald Baker in the semi-finals. He served in the British Army with the 8th Battalion, Royal Fusiliers and was posted missing, aged 34, during the Battle of the Somme in France on 7 July 1916 as a Company Serjeant Major. His remains were not recovered, and his name is recorded on the Thiepval Memorial.

1908 Olympic results
Below is the record of William Philo, a British middleweight boxer who competed at the 1908 London Olympics:

 Round of 16: defeated Arthur Murdoch (Great Britain) by decision, 2-1
 Quarterfinal: bye
 Semifinal: lost to Reginald Baker (Australia & New Zealand) by first-round knockout (was awarded bronze medal)

See also
 List of Olympians killed in World War I

References

1882 births
1916 deaths
British military personnel killed in the Battle of the Somme
Boxers at the 1908 Summer Olympics
Boxers from Greater London
Middleweight boxers
Olympic boxers of Great Britain
Olympic bronze medallists for Great Britain
Royal Fusiliers officers
Olympic medalists in boxing
English male boxers
Medalists at the 1908 Summer Olympics
Missing in action of World War I
Missing person cases in France
British Army personnel of World War I
Military personnel from London